Lasnamäe Indoor Arena is a multipurpose indoor arena at Lasnamäe, Tallinn, Estonia. It was built in 2003 and is one of the biggest indoor arenas in Estonia.

It hosts annually the athletics event Tallinn Indoor Meeting.

Athletics records

World records

Stadium records
Updated 26 February 2022.

Men

Women

References

External links
Home page – Tallinn Sports Hall
Info at Tallinn homepage
Info at Estonian sports registry
Info at Estonian Athletic Association homepage

Sports venues in Estonia
Indoor arenas in Estonia
Sports venues in Tallinn
Athletics (track and field) venues in Estonia
2003 establishments in Estonia
Sports venues completed in 2003